The Medal of the 40th Anniversary of People's Poland (Polish: Medal 40-lecia Polski Ludowej) is a former civil decoration of Poland established by the Sejm on 26 April 1984 to recognize the contribution of working people in the development of the socialist state. It was awarded between 22 July 1984 and 22 July 1985. It was disestablished in 1992. 

Similar medals were established to mark the 10th anniversary (in 1954) and 30th anniversary (in 1974) of the People's Republic of Poland.

References 

1984 establishments in Poland
Civil awards and decorations of Poland
Awards established in 1984
Awards disestablished in 1992